
Year 110 BC was a year of the pre-Julian Roman calendar. At the time it was known as the Year of the Consulship of Rufus and Albinus (or, less frequently, year 644 Ab urbe condita) and the First Year of Yuanfeng. The denomination 110 BC for this year has been used since the early medieval period, when the Anno Domini calendar era became the prevalent method in Europe for naming years.

Events 
 By place 

 Roman Republic 
 Jugurtha, king of Numidia, defeats a Roman army under Aulus Postumius Albinus.

 Asia 
Han conquest of Dongyue
 In winter, the Han general Yang Pu retakes Wulin, and a faction of Dongyue nobles kill their king Zou Yushan before surrendering to the Han general Han Yue.
 Emperor Wu of Han annexes Dongyue and Minyue and relocates their population to the area between the Yangtze and Huai rivers.

Births 
 Asander, king of the Bosporan Kingdom (d. 17 BC)
 Hillel the Elder, Jewish religious leader (approximate date) (d. AD 10)
 Marcus Petreius, Roman general and politician (d. 46 BC)
 Titus Pomponius Atticus, Roman banker (d. 32 BC)

Deaths 
 Sima Tan, Chinese astrologist and historian

References